Puthanparambil Babakhan Abdul Razzaq Saleh (28 November 1928 – 24 June 1979), nicknamed Kottayam Saleh, was an Indian football player. He was part of the team that played against Yugoslavia in a 10–1 defeat at the 1952 Summer Olympics.

Playing career
Saleh, who played on the left wing, came from Kerala and played nine seasons for East Bengal, and captained the team in 1950–51. He represented India internationally under coaching of Syed Abdul Rahim.

Personal life
Saleh worked in the Geological Survey of India and later as a senior superintendent in Customs. He died in 1979 from a heart attack during a train journey.

Honours
East Bengal
 IFA Shield: 1949, 1950, 1951
Bengal
 Santosh Trophy: 1950-51

India
Asian Games Gold medal: 1951

See also
Pancha Pandavas

References

External links
 

Indian footballers
India international footballers
Footballers from Kerala
East Bengal Club players
Olympic footballers of India
Footballers at the 1952 Summer Olympics
Asian Games medalists in football
Footballers at the 1951 Asian Games
Medalists at the 1951 Asian Games
Asian Games gold medalists for India
Association football forwards
Calcutta Football League players